Alan Stephens (born 13 October 1952) is an English former professional footballer who played as a full back. Active in England and the United States, Stephens made nearly 100 appearances in a five-year career.

Career
Born in Liverpool, Stephens played professionally in England and the United States for Wolverhampton Wanderers, Crewe Alexandra, the Seattle Sounders and the San Diego Jaws.

References

1952 births
Living people
Footballers from Liverpool
English footballers
Association football fullbacks
Wolverhampton Wanderers F.C. players
Crewe Alexandra F.C. players
Seattle Sounders (1974–1983) players
San Diego Jaws players
English Football League players
North American Soccer League (1968–1984) players
North American Soccer League (1968–1984) indoor players
English expatriate footballers
English expatriate sportspeople in the United States
Expatriate soccer players in the United States